My Heart Is Broken is a song by Evanescence

My Heart Is Broken may also refer to:
My Heart Is Broken, 1964 collection of stories by Mavis Gallant
"My Heart Is Broken", song by Ryan Adams from Jacksonville City Nights and Theme for a Trucker

See also
"My Heart Is Broken in Three", single by Slim Whitman 1952